An interreligious organization or interfaith organization is an organization that encourages dialogue and cooperation between the world's different religions. In 1893, the Parliament of the Worlds Religions held, in conjunction with the World Colombian Exposition, a conference  held in Chicago that is believed to be the first interfaith gathering of notable significance. In the century since, many local, national and international organizations have been founded.

International organizations
 American Jewish Committee (AJC) Dept of Interreligious Affairs, established 1906
 Berkley Center for Religion, Peace, and World Affairs at Georgetown University
 Center for Jewish-Christian Understanding and Cooperation (CJCUC), established 2008
 Council for a Parliament of the World’s Religions, established 1988
 The Elijah Interfaith Institute, established 1997
 European Council of Religious Leaders, established 2002
 Fellowship of Reconciliation (FOR), established 1914
 Focolare Movement
 Institute for Interreligious Dialogue
 The Interfaith Encounter Association
 Interfaith Worker Justice
 The International Association for Religious Freedom (IARF), established 1900
 International Council of Christians and Jews (ICCJ), established 1975
 Interreligious and International Federation for World Peace
 International Humanist and Ethical Union - world body for Humanism that promotes comparative religion and inter religious dialogue
 The Lutheran World Federation Program on Interfaith and Peace, established 1947
 KAICIID Dialogue Centre, established in 2012
 North American Interfaith Network (NAIN), established 2000
 The Religious Institute on Sexual Morality, Justice, and Healing, established 2000
 The Sovereign Order of the Ecumenical Knights of Malta O.S.J.
 Tanenbaum Center for Interreligious Understanding
 Temple of Understanding (ToU), established 1960
 United Religions Initiative (URI), established 2000
 The Vatican’s Pontifical Council for Interreligious Dialogue, established 1964
 The World Conference of Religions for Peace, established 1970
 World Council of Churches Team on Interreligious Relations, established 1948
 1000 Abrahamic Circles Project established 2018

National and local bodies
 Inter-Religious Organisation, (Singapore), established 1949
 Comité Pro Paz (Chile), 1973-1975; supported human rights during the Pinochet regime
 The Interfaith Alliance (USA), established 1994
 Interfaith Partners of South Carolina (USA), established 2010
 Malaysian Consultative Council of Buddhism, Christianity, Hinduism, Sikhism and Taoism, established 1983
 Network of Spiritual Progressives, established 2006
 Muslim-Jewish Advisory Council, established 2016
 Interfaith Families Project of Greater Washington, D.C., established in 1995

Governmental Institutions
Some governmental institutions are geared specifically with dealing with diversity of religions.

Australasian Police Multicultural Advisory Bureau

See also
 Interfaith dialogue

Interfaith organizations
Interreligious